A by-election was held for the Australian House of Representatives seat of Dalley on 9 May 1953. This was triggered by the death of Labor MP and former Speaker Sol Rosevear.

The by-election was won by Labor candidate Arthur Greenup.

Results

See also
Electoral results for the Division of Dalley
List of Australian federal by-elections

References

1953 elections in Australia
New South Wales federal by-elections